The 2019–20 season was Damac's 48th year in their history and first season back in the Pro League since the 1981–82 season after gaining promotion for finishing in the second place in the MS League last season. The club participated in the Pro League and the King Cup.

The season covered the period from 1 July 2019 to 9 September 2020.

Players

Squad information

Out on loan

Transfers and loans

Transfers in

Loans in

Transfers out

Loans out

Pre-season

Competitions

Overall

Overview

Goalscorers

Last Updated: 9 September 2020

Clean sheets

Last Updated: 4 September 2020

References

Damac FC seasons
Damac